Cordemoy  is a surname. Notable people with the surname include:

 Jean-Louis de Cordemoy (1655–1714), French architectural historian
 Géraud de Cordemoy (1626–1684), French philosopher, historian, and lawyer
 Eugène Jacob de Cordemoy, French physician and botanist of the nineteenth century